The mixed team compound competition at the 2015 World Archery Championships took place from 26 July to 1 August in Copenhagen, Denmark.

42 countries entered at least one archer each into the men's and women's competitions, thus becoming eligible for the mixed team competition. The combined totals of the highest placed archers for each gender from each country in the qualification round were added together, and the 16 teams with the highest combined scores competed in the elimination rounds.

Schedule
All times are local (UTC+01:00).

Qualification round
Pre-tournament world rankings ('WR') are taken from the 18 July 2015 World Archery Rankings.

 Qualified for eliminations

Elimination rounds

References

2015 World Archery Championships